William Frederick Jurges (May 9, 1908 – March 3, 1997) was an American shortstop, third baseman, manager, coach and scout in Major League Baseball. He was born in the Bronx, New York. During the 1930s, he was central to three (and ) National League champion Chicago Cubs teams. In July 1932, Jurges recovered from gunshot wounds—suffered when a distraught former girlfriend tried to kill him—to help lead the Cubs to the pennant.

Career as a player
He collected 1,613 hits, with 245 doubles, 55 triples and 43 home runs.  

Although he was a light hitter, Jurges was known as a top-flight fielder as a shortstop. Baseball Reference credits him with leading in the National League in such defensive categories as Defensive Wins Above Replacement and Range Factor. He led NL shortstops in fielding percentage four times and in double plays once.

During his first eight seasons (1931–38) in Chicago, he anchored an infield of Stan Hack (third base), Billy Herman (second base), and Charlie Grimm or Phil Cavarretta (first base). He then played seven more seasons (1939–45) with the New York Giants, missing over 90 games in  after he was hit in the head by a pitched ball. However, he recovered to play regularly for the Giants from 1941 to 1943. He then returned to the Cubs as a player-coach in 1946–47. For a while, during the off-seasons in the 1930s, Jurges stayed in shape by working out at the Waple Studio of Physical Culture in Alexandria, Virginia.

Shooting
On July 6, 1932, Violet Valli, a showgirl with whom Jurges was romantically linked, tried to kill Jurges at the Hotel Carlos, where both lived.  Jurges had previously tried to end their relationship. Valli (born Violet Popovich) also left a suicide note in which she blamed Cubs outfielder Kiki Cuyler for convincing Jurges to break up with her. Although initial reports stated that Jurges was shot while trying to wrestle the gun from Valli, later reports, based on Valli's suicide note, stated that she was trying to kill Jurges as well as commit suicide.

A week after the shooting, charges were dismissed against Valli when Jurges appeared in court and announced that he would not testify and wished to drop the charges. Valli was later involved in a lawsuit when she sued a real estate developer who was blackmailing her by threatening to release letters in which Valli threatened Jurges. 

Future baseball club owner Bill Veeck was working for the Cubs at the time, and later wrote in his memoir The Hustler's Handbook (Ch. 6) that the intended victim was actually a married player of whom Valli had been the mistress. This player was hanging out in Jurges's room, and Jurges was shot trying to defuse the situation. Jurges, being single, covered for the other player and made it seem like he had jilted the showgirl. 

The shooting of Jurges — and/or a later shooting of fellow ballplayer Eddie Waitkus at a Chicago hotel in 1949 — may have inspired author Bernard Malamud in penning the story of Roy Hobbs in his novel The Natural, 
which was published in 1952 and made into a Hollywood film starring Robert Redford and Glenn Close in 1984.

Career as coach, manager and scout
Jurges was a full-time coach for the Cubs in 1948 under manager Grimm. On July 3, still a Washington coach, he was named the surprise manager of the Boston Red Sox, who had fired Pinky Higgins. Jurges' appointment was hurriedly announced by Boston general manager Bucky Harris without consulting owner Tom Yawkey.

Managing from the third-base coach's box, Jurges was able to rally Boston in 1959: the Bosox won 44 of 80 games under him, improving from eighth to fifth place, and finally broke the color line with the promotion of Pumpsie Green from the minor leagues.

Composed of aging veterans and mostly unpromising youngsters—and stunned by the sudden retirement, in his prime, of right fielder and  Most Valuable Player Jackie Jensen—the 1960 Red Sox fell into the American League basement after losing 27 of their first 42 games. Jurges, an intense competitor, suffered in an alien organization composed largely of cronies of owner Yawkey. The Red Sox front office was about to undergo a massive shakeup, with Harris, Jurges' patron, on his way out the door. On June 8, Jurges left the team, citing illness. (Some Boston baseball writers believed that he suffered from nervous exhaustion.) He was fired two days later, and, after bench coach Del Baker handled the team for five days, Higgins returned to the manager's post he had lost 11 months before.

Jurges never managed again in baseball (his final record was 59 wins, 63 losses — .484) but he scouted for six teams before his final retirement: the Baltimore Orioles, New York Mets, Houston Colt .45s/Astros, the expansion Washington Senators and its successor, the Texas Rangers, the Seattle Mariners and the Cubs. He died at age 88 in Clearwater, Florida.

Managerial record

References

External links
Jack Bales, "The Shootings of Billy Jurges and Eddie Waitkus," WrigleyIvy.com.
Jack Bales, "The Chicago Cub Shot for Love: A Showgirl's Crime of Passion and the 1932 World Series." Charleston, SC: The History Press, 2021.

Retrosheet

1908 births
1997 deaths
American shooting survivors
Baltimore Orioles scouts
Baseball players from New York (state)
Boston Red Sox managers
Chicago Cubs coaches
Chicago Cubs players
Chicago Cubs scouts
Houston Astros scouts
Louisville Colonels (minor league) players
Major League Baseball shortstops
Major League Baseball third base coaches
Manchester Blue Sox players
Minor league baseball managers
New York Giants (NL) players
New York Mets scouts
People from the Bronx
People from Largo, Florida
Reading Keystones players
Seattle Mariners scouts
Texas Rangers scouts
Washington Senators (1901–1960) coaches
Washington Senators (1961–1971) scouts